Geddes is a crater on Mercury. It has a diameter of 84 kilometers. Its name was adopted by the International Astronomical Union (IAU) in 2010. Geddes is named for the Irish stained glass artist Wilhelmina Geddes, who lived from 1887 to 1955.

Antoniadi Dorsum cuts across Geddes crater.

Hollows
Hollows are present on the floor of Geddes crater, mostly at the rims of smaller craters within it, and along the rim of the central depression.

References

Impact craters on Mercury